The 1997 Mediterranean Games football tournament was the 13th edition of the Mediterranean Games men's football tournament. The football tournament was held in Bari, Italy between 8 and 25 June 1997 as part of the 1997 Mediterranean Games and was contested by 13 teams, all countries were represented by the Olympic teams. Italy won the gold medal.

Participating teams
Thirteen teams for U-23 took part in the tournament, 2 teams from Africa and 11 teams from Europe.

System
The 13 teams will be divided into three groups of three teams and one group of four teams. Teams are awarded three points for a win and one for a draw. No points are awarded for a defeat. The top sides in each group will advance to the semi-finals.

Squads

Venues
7 stadiums were allocated to host the matches.

Tournament
All times local : CET (UTC+1)

Group stage

Group A

Group B

Group C

Group D

Knockout stage

Semi-finals

Third place match

Final

Final standings

References

1997
Football
1996–97 in European football
1997 in African football
1997